The 1982 AIAW National Division III Basketball Championship was the third annual and final tournament hosted by the Association for Intercollegiate Athletics for Women to determine the national champion of collegiate basketball among its Division III members in the United States.

The tournament was held in Cedar Rapids, Iowa.

Concordia–Moorhead defeated Mount Mercy in the championship game, 73–72, to capture the Cobbers' first AIAW Division III national title.

Format
Seven teams participated in a single-elimination tournament, a decrease in nine teams from the previous year's championship.

The tournament also included a third-place game for the two teams that lost in the semifinal games.

Tournament bracket

See also
1982 AIAW National Division I Basketball Championship (final edition)
1982 AIAW National Division II Basketball Championship (final edition)
1982 NAIA women's basketball tournament

References

AIAW women's basketball tournament
AIAW Division III
AIAW National Division III Basketball Championship
1982 in sports in Iowa
Women's sports in Iowa